"Pour être libre" is a song by French singer Lââm from her 2005 studio album Pour être libre. On 17 February 2006 it was released as a single, which debuted at number 17 in France.

Composition and recording 
The song was written by Géraldine Delacoux and Teetoff and produced by FB Cool.

Track listings 
CD single (Heben / RCA 82876746072)
 "Pour être libre" (3:50)
 "Ce n'est que pour toi" (4:46)
 "Pour être libre" (Instrumental) (3:50)
Extras:
 "Pour être libre" (Video)

Charts

References 

2005 songs
2006 singles
Lââm songs
Heben Music singles